Nedumangad is a  town and municipality in Thiruvananthapuram metropolitan area of Thiruvananthapuram district in the Indian state of Kerala, and is the headquarters of Nedumangad tehsil and Nedumangad Revenue Division (RDO). It is a suburb of the extended metropolitan region of Thiruvananthapuram city. It is located around 16 km to the north-east of Thiruvananthapuram city on the Thiruvananthapuram  – Shenkottah (State Highway 2). It is an important commercial center in the district. It is a growing commercial and educational hub and all important government institutions are situated in the town. Nedumangadu Market is important in South Kerala.
  
It is an important centre for commercial trade in hill products such as pepper and rubber. A wholesale market set up by the Department of Agriculture (with the assistance of the European Union) is also situated there.

History
Nedumangad panchayat was formed in 1936. It was one among the four Panchayats sanctioned by Sir C.P.Ramaswamy Iyer (Diwan-Thiruvithamcore). The others were Paravur, Boothapandi  and Perumbavoor. In 1978 Nedumangad Municipality was established.

Nedumangad Chantha Revolt

Nedumangad was a main center of trade in Thiruvananthapuram. Lower caste people were not allowed to enter in the trade markets (Chantha) of Nedumangad and items brought by them from their farms have to be placed outside and used to get a lower price. A group of people under the leadership of Ayyankali questioned this social injustice which resulted in a great revolt and fought back their rights to enter and sell the goods of lower caste people in Nedumangad market and the trade markets nearby. This is known as Nedumangad Chantha revolt.

Behind the name Nedumangad
There are still many opinions as to how the taluk Nedumangad got its name. It is said that there is a fruit called Neduvan and that it is the land of a local ruler named Neduvan. According to some historical sources, the old name of Nedumangad was Ilavallur Nadu.

Social and cultural history
The adivasis are the tribal people of the region. From 1677 to 1689 AD, Umayamurani, who ruled Travancore, lost a battle and escaped to Koyikkal Palace, Nedumangad. The queen sought the help of Kerala Varma to defeat the Mukkappappa. History has indicated that Kerala Varma defeated Mukulapada in Thiruvattar and took Umayamma Rani to Trivandrum. With the arrival of Umayamma Rani to Koyikkal Palace, merchants, gold smiths and the Tamil Brahmins who became Puajaris also settled here. The Tamil Brahmins became the heirs of most land in the area. The palace at Karipur, Pulellunthu Mallan's family head, Karippur Mudipura are some of the historical places linked to the ancient history of Nedumangad. Nedumangad Koyikkal palace is one of the few buildings that was built in the 15th century Kerala Architectural style. The historic Koyikkal Palace has been maintained since 1979 by the Kerala State Department of Archaeology. Nedumangad Street struggle was one of the historical struggles of the national movement during Independence. The LLA LP School, which started as "Pallalu school", is the first school to be established here. The first library was the Guruvayur Vidyalaya. Karimbikkavu Sree DharmaSastha Temple, Thirichittoor Siva-Vishnu Temple, Mannamkonam Sree Bhagavathy Temple, Indalayappan Temple, Ardhanarisheshwara Temple, Muthumariamman Temple, Melamcode Temple, Mutharamman Temple, Pathadavu, Pazhavadi Ganapati Temple, Paranthokha Bhagwati Temple, Nedumangad Town Muslim Jamaath Complex and the Christian Church are some of the oldest shrines in the region. Nedumangad's commercial history is connected with agriculture. Nedumangad Public Market is the largest market in the district of Thiruvananthapuram. It is the largest market for the hill stations and agricultural commodities. The Agrarian Sales Complex, by the Department of Agriculture, is set up with the help of the European Economic Community. Thiruvananthapuram - Chenkotta  (State Highway 2) and Shorlakode – Nedumangad State Highway (SH 3) are the most important interstate routes passing through Nedumangad. The road that connects Ponmudi to Thiruvananthapuram City passes through Nedumangad. The distance from Nedumangad to the capital city is only 18 km. The first Folklore Museum and the Museum of Numismatics in Kerala was established at Nedumangad Koyikkal Palace on 27 March 1992. The Koyikkal Palace is located next to the municipal office. Liquid Propulsion Systems Centre (LPSC), a research and development centre functioning under Indian Space Research Organisation (ISRO), is located at Valiyamala near Nedumangad.

Geography
It has an average elevation of 68 metres (223 feet).

It lies 18 km from Thiruvananthapuram (or Trivandrum) on the way to Thenkasi and Ponmudi hill resort. It is the capital of the taluk and is unique for lacking a coastal belt and railway lines.

It is bounded on the west by Trivandrum Taluk, on the east by the State of Tamil Nadu, on the south by Neyyattinkara Taluk and on the north by Kollam District.

Places of interest
Nedumangad is a gate way of various tourist places in Trivandrum. The main attractions are: 
Agasthyarkoodam, a mountain preserve famous for its abundant ayurvedic herbs and medicinal plants is around 50 km away. About 32 km from Nedumangad, en route to the Ponmudi Hill Resort lies the Peppara Wildlife Sanctuary, which is of particular interest to ornithologists. Near Nedumangad town another Monolithic – Thirichittoor Rock (Thiruchittapara) is located. With Siva Vishnu Temple, many monkeys congregated here. The name Nedumangadu means kadu (forest) of Vishnu, who was called Neduman, Neduvan, and Nediyavan in ancient texts like Chilappadikaram.

Kerala's Numismatic museum is at Koikkal Palace within Nedumangad Town. The palace was the residence of one of the prominent matriarchal lines of Travancore.

Aruvikkara Dam
Peppara Dam 
Neyyardam
Mankayam waterfalls
Vazhvanthol waterfalls
Meenmutty waterfalls
Lower meenmooty
Thenmala dam

Transport

Road Transport
Nedumangad has well road network which connect nearby towns and cities. Four important State Highways (SH) pass through Nedumangad. There is no National Highway through Nedumangad .  The main interstate Road through Nedumangad is Thiruvananthapuram –Thenmala (State Highway 2) is connecting the city of Trivandrum with  Tenkasi and other major roads are SH 3 connecting Surulacod / Kanyakumari / Aralvaimozhi, SH 45 connecting Ponmudi hill station and SH 47 connecting Attingal NH 66 / Vembayam                       
SH 1 /
Main-Central Road and also SH 1
|Main-Central Road is only 9 km from Nedumangad Town. Bus service is operated by Kerala state Road Transport Corporation (Ksrtc). KSRTC operate services from Nedumangad to high ranges, all parts of district and major towns and cities of Kerala and Outside.

Air
 Nearest airport is Thiruvananthapuram International Airport (TRV) – 22 km

Rail
No railway lines pass through Nedumangadu. The nearest railway station is Thiruvananthapuram – 18 km. The next nearest railway station is Chirayinkeezhu near Attingal – 31 km.Thenmala Railway station 54 Km

Demographics

Population of Children with age of 0–6 is 5676 which is 9.43% of total population of Nedumangad (M). In Nedumangad Municipality, Female Sex Ratio is of 1073 against state average of 1084. Moreover, the Child Sex Ratio in Nedumangad is around 926 compared to Kerala state average of 964. Literacy rate of Nedumangad city is 93.28% lower than state average of 94.00%. In Nedumangad, Male literacy is around 95.80% while female literacy rate is 90.97%.

Administration

Taluk
Nedumangad (tehsil) is bounded on the west by Thiruvananthapuram Taluk, on the east by the State of Tamil Nadu, on the south by Kattakada Taluk and on the north by Kollam District. Nedumangad Taluk has 25 villages and one Municipality headed by tehsildar. It is the second-most-populous and largest taluk in Thiruvananthapuram District

Villages
Anad, Aruvikkara, Aryanad, Kallara, Karakulam, Karippooru, Koliyakode, Kurupuzha, Manikkal, Nedumangad, Nellanad, Palode, Panavoor, Pangode, Peringamala, Pullampara, Theakada, Thennoor, Tholicode, Uzhamalackal, Vamanapuram, Vattappara, Vellanad, Vembannur, Vembayam, Vithura.

Municipalities
There is only one municipality, Nedumangad, which is also the headquarters of the taluk. In 1978 Nedumangad panchayath is upgrade into Municipality. The municipality has 39 electoral wards. Sreeja CS of CPIM is chairperson of Nedumangad Municipality.

Assembly constituencies
Nedumangad (tehsil) comprises the constituencies of Nedumangadu, Aruvikkara and Vamanapuram. These assembly constituencies are part of Attingal (Lok sabha constituency)

Revenue Division
Thiruvananthapuram district is divided into two revenue divisions, Thiruvananthapuram and Nedumangad. Nedumangad revenue division comprises Nedumangad and Kattakada taluks headed by Revenue Divisional officer.

Block panchayath
Nedumangad taluk comprises three block anchayaths: Nedumangad, Vellanad, and Vamanapuram. Nedumangad block panchayath consists of five grama panchayaths.
 Anad Grama panchayath
 Aruvikkara Grama panchayath
 Karakulam Grama panchayath
 Panavoor Grama panchayath
 Vembayam Grama panchayath

Educational institutions
Indian Institute of Space Science and Technology (IIST)
Indian Institute of Science Education and Research, Thiruvananthapuram
Government Girls HSS
Government VHSS for Boys
Government HSS Poovathoor
Government HSS Karipooru
Government Technical HSS
Government Polytechnic College
Government College Nedumangad
Government Teachers Training College
Government Town LPS
Government Boys UPS
Sree Narayana Vilasam HSS, Anad
Lourdes Mount Higher Secondary School, Vattappara 
Darsana HSS
Kairali Vidhya Bhavan CBSE
Nightingale college of Nursing
Mohandas College of Engineering
Heera College of Engineering
Muslim Association college of Arts and Science

Politics
Nedumangad assembly constituency is part of the Attingal (Lok Sabha constituency). G R Anil of CPI is MLA of Nedumangad assembly constituency and Adoor Prakash of INC is MP of Attingal Lok Sabha constituency. Nedumangad assembly constituency includes:
Nedumangad Municipality
Karakulam Grama panchayath
Vembayam Grama panchayath
Manikkal Grama panchayath
Pothencode Grama panchayath
Andoorkonam Grama panchayath

Places of worship
SreeMuthaaramman Devi Temple
SreeMuthmaariamman Devi Temple
Melamcode Devi Temple
Sree Mahadeva Temple Koyikkal
Thirichittoor Siva-Vishnu Temple
Mukhavoor Mahavishnu Temple
Nedumangad Town Juma Masjid
Valicode Juma Masjid
Markas Masjid
Aurthur Parker Memorial Csi Church
St Jerome Malankara Catholic Church
Christhu Raja Forona Church

See also

 Neyyattinkara
 Thiruvananthapuram
 South Paravoor
 Kollam
palode

References

External links
 Remaining Date for Nedumangad Municipality Election 2020

Cities and towns in Thiruvananthapuram district